Philippe Emanuel, Prince of Hornes, Prince of Overisque, Count of Solre-le-Château (31 August 1661 in Condé – 14 October 1718 in Bailleul, Somme), was the son of Eugene Maximilian, Prince of Hornes and Princess Anne Marie Jeanne of Croÿ.  He married Princess Marie Anne Antoninette of Ligne.

His domain, the Principality of Hornes, was a part of the Holy Roman Empire in what is now modern France, Germany, Belgium and the Netherlands. It was surrounded by the Principality of Liège. It had 3 enclaves, which were in France.

Issue
He married Princess Marie Anne Antoinette of Ligne and had six children. They were:

Princes of Hornes
1661 births
1718 deaths